This article presents lists of the literary events and publications in 2022.

Events 
1 January – The 2022 New Year Honours List in the UK includes novelist Anthony Horowitz, cookery writer Claudia Roden and publisher Peter Usborne, all of whom receive the CBE.
5 January – The Robert B. Silvers Foundation awards the inaugural Robert B. Silvers Prizes to recognize excellence in journalism, literary criticism, and arts writing.
11 January – Maya Angelou becomes the first African-American woman to appear on a quarter-dollar coin in the United States. 
25 January – Colm Tóibín is named the new Laureate for Irish Fiction.
22 April – The results of a survey carried out by Mayank Kejriwal and Akarsh Nagaraj at the University of Southern California's Viterbi School of Engineering, using AI, reveal evidence of gender bias in literature.
4 May – Ram Nath Kovind becomes the first President of India to address a regional language literary event in the northeast when he attends the closing session of the annual conference of the Bodo Sahitya Sabha in Tamulpur, western Assam. 
2 June – British literary figures recognised in the 2022 Birthday Honours include novelists Ian Rankin (knighthood) and Salman Rushdie; the latter is made a Companion of Honour, along with illustrator Sir Quentin Blake.
15 June – Opening of Shakespeare North in Prescot in northwest England, incorporating a replica early-17th century playhouse.
12 August – Indian-born British-American novelist Salman Rushdie is stabbed multiple times as he is about to give a public lecture at the Chautauqua Institution in Chautauqua, New York, United States.

Anniversaries
200th anniversary of the death of English poet Percy Bysshe Shelley
150th anniversary of Publishers Weekly
100th anniversary of the Newbery Medal
100th anniversary of the birth of poet Philip Larkin
100th anniversary of the publication of
In a Grove by Ryūnosuke Akutagawa
One of Ours by Willa Cather
"The Problem of Thor Bridge" by Arthur Conan Doyle
The Waste Land by T. S. Eliot
The Beautiful and Damned by F. Scott Fitzgerald
Tales of the Jazz Age by F. Scott Fitzgerald
"The Curious Case of Benjamin Button"
Siddhartha by Hermann Hesse
Ulysses by James Joyce
"A Hunger Artist" by Franz Kafka
Aaron's Rod by D. H. Lawrence
Babbitt by Sinclair Lewis
"Celephaïs" by H. P. Lovecraft
"Herbert West–Reanimator" by H. P. Lovecraft
"The Music of Erich Zann" by H. P. Lovecraft
"The Tomb" by H. P. Lovecraft
The Garden Party and Other Stories by Katherine Mansfield
"The Garden Party"
The Velveteen Rabbit by Margery Williams
Jacob's Room by Virginia Woolf

New books 
Dates after each title indicate U.S. publication, unless otherwise indicated.

Fiction

Children and young adults

Poetry 
Ocean Vuong – Time Is a Mother (April 5, US)

Drama

Nonfiction

Biography and memoirs

Deaths

Awards

Adult

Children's, Teen, and Young Adult

See also

References 

 
2022-related lists
Culture-related timelines by year
Years of the 21st century in literature